Dominican Republic competed at the 1992 Summer Paralympics in Barcelona, Spain. 1 competitor from Dominican Republic won no medals and so did not place in the medal table.

See also 
 Dominican Republic at the Paralympics
 Dominican Republic at the 1992 Summer Olympics

References 

Dominican Republic at the Paralympics
Nations at the 1992 Summer Paralympics